Joe Wardle (born 22 September 1991) is a Scotland international rugby league footballer who plays as a  or  forward for the Leigh Leopards in the Betfred Super League.

He previously played for the Bradford Bulls, Huddersfield and the Castleford Tigers (Heritage № 981) in the Super League, and the Newcastle Knights in the NRL. He spent time on loan from the Giants at the Barrow Raiders in the Championship in 2011. He has also spent time on loan from Castleford at Huddersfield in the Super League.

Background
Wardle was born in Halifax, West Yorkshire, England.

Career

Bradford Bulls
Wardle came through the ranks at Bradford Bulls after signing from Illingworth A.R.L.F.C.

Wardle made his début for the Bradford Bulls against Warrington Wolves in the Challenge Cup in May 2010. He débuted in the Super League a week later against the Huddersfield Giants. He made his first start for the club in the next game against Crusaders RL, but suffered an injury which prevented him from establishing a regular place in the first team. He returned to play for the under-20's team after recovering from the injury, but suffered a torn quadriceps, which would keep him out of action for the rest of the season. In September 2010, he rejected a new contract from Bradford, and instead signed for the Huddersfield Giants.

Huddersfield Giants
In 2011, he spent time on loan at the Barrow Raiders. After performing well in the first half of the season, he was given a two-year contract extension, keeping him at the Galpharm Stadium until the end of 2014. In July 2013, he was rewarded with a further contract extension until 2017. He was named the 2014 Huddersfield Giants season's player of the year.

Newcastle Knights
During the 2016 season, Wardle signed a contract with National Rugby League side the Newcastle Knights, starting in 2018. However, he was able to gain a release in December to join the Newcastle Knights a year early ahead of the 2017 season, on a 3-year contract.

He made his Newcastle Knights début in round 4 of the 2017 season against the Penrith Panthers.

Castleford Tigers
Wardle only played 17 matches for the Newcastle Knights after becoming homesick and gaining a release to return to England on a 3-year contract with Super League side the Castleford Tigers.

Leigh Centurions
On 15 Oct 2021 it was reported that he had signed for Leigh Centurions in the RFL Championship

International career
In October and November 2013, he played for Scotland in their 2013 Rugby League World Cup campaign.

In October and November 2014, he played in the 2014 European Cup competition.

References

External links

Huddersfield Giants profile
Castleford Tigers profile
Newcastle Knights profile
SL profile
Joe Wardle Makes Bradford Bulls Debut

1991 births
Living people
Barrow Raiders players
Bradford Bulls players
Castleford Tigers players
English people of Scottish descent
English rugby league players
Huddersfield Giants players
Leigh Leopards players
Newcastle Knights players
Rugby league centres
Rugby league players from Halifax, West Yorkshire
Rugby league second-rows
Scotland national rugby league team players